Paint and Paint is the second and final studio album by the British new wave band Haircut One Hundred, released in 1984 by Polydor Records. It was their only album released after the early 1983 departure of lead singer Nick Heyward. As a result, the band's percussionist, Marc Fox, assumed lead vocal duties. The band's longtime drummer Blair Cunningham performs on the album, but was not listed as an official member.

Unlike the band's first album, Paint and Paint was not a commercial success and failed to chart, and none of the singles released from it reached the UK top 40.

Track listing
"Fish in a Bowl"
"Immaterial"
"So Tired"
"Hidden Years"
"40-40 Home"
"High Noon"
"Too Up, Two Down"
"Benefit of the Doubt"
"Prime Time"
"Where Do You Run to Now?"
"Infatuation"
All tracks written by Marc Fox, Les Nemes, Graham Jones and Phil Smith, except "Where Do You Run to Now?" written by Steve French and Marc Fox.

Double CD reissue (1999,2017)

UK singles

"Prime Time"
Release Date: 1983
UK Chart: 46
Notes: HC1 and HCX1 came in special carry bags.
7" (HC1):
"Prime Time"
"Too Up Two Down"
7" picture disc (HCP1):
"Prime Time"
"Too Up Two Down"
12" (HCX1):
"Prime Time (Late Night Shopping Version)"
"Too Up Two Down"

"So Tired"
Release Date: 1983
UK Chart: 94
7" (HC2):
"So Tired"
"Fish in a Bowl"
7" mirror disc (HCP2):
"So Tired"
"Fish in a Bowl"
12" (HCX2):
"So Tired (Long Slumber)"
"So Tired (Forty Winks)"
"Fish in a Bowl (Deeper Version)"

"Too Up Two Down"
Release Date: 1984
UK Chart: -
7" (HC3):
"Too Up, Two Down"
"Evil Smokestacking Baby"
12" (HCX3):
"Too Up, Two Down"
"Evil Smokestacking Baby"
"After It's All Been Said And Done"

Personnel

Haircut 100
Les Nemes - bass
Graham Jones - guitar
Phil Smith - soprano, alto, and tenor saxophones; glockenspiel
Marc Fox - percussion (timbales, congas, tubular bells, timpani), vocals

Other musicians
Blair Cunningham - drums, percussion
Graham Ward - drums, percussion
Steve French - piano and keyboards
Richard Cottle - keyboards
Guy Barker - trumpet, flugelhorn
Steve Sidwell - trumpet
Pete Beechill - trombone
Spike Edney - trombone
Vince Sullivan - trombone

References

1984 albums
Haircut One Hundred albums
Albums produced by John Punter
Albums produced by Bob Sargeant
Polydor Records albums